Hopin, Kachin State is a town in Myanmar.

Hopin may also refer to:

 Hopin (software)
 Hopin, Shan State, a village in Myanmar
 Hopin Academy